Lemond is an unincorporated community in Lemond Township, Steele County, Minnesota, United States, near Owatonna and Ellendale.  The community is located near the junction of Steele County Roads 4 and 7, and SW 89th Avenue.

References

Unincorporated communities in Steele County, Minnesota
Unincorporated communities in Minnesota